The 2018–19 winter transfer window for English football transfers opens on 1 January and will close on 1 February. Additionally, players without a club may join at any time, clubs may sign players on loan at any time, and clubs may sign a goalkeeper on an emergency loan if they have no registered goalkeeper available. This list includes transfers featuring at least one Premier League or English Football League club which were completed after the end of the summer 2018 transfer window and before the end of the 2018–19 winter window.

Transfers
All players and clubs without a flag are English. Note that while Cardiff City and Swansea City are affiliated with the Football Association of Wales and thus take the Welsh flag, they play in the English league system, and so their transfers are included here.

References

England
Winter 2018-19